Evan "Ev" Clark Williams (born March 31, 1972) is an American billionaire technology entrepreneur and executive. He is a co-founder of Twitter, and served as CEO of Twitter, Inc. from 2008 to 2010 and as a member of its board from 2007 to 2019. He founded Blogger and Medium, two of the largest blogging internet platforms. In 2014, he co-founded the venture capital firm Obvious Ventures. , his net worth is estimated at US$2.1 billion.

Early life and education
Williams was born in Clarks, Nebraska, as the third child of Laurie Howe and Monte Williams. He grew up on a farm in Clarks, where he assisted with crop irrigation during the summers. He attended the University of Nebraska–Lincoln for a year and a half, where he joined FarmHouse fraternity, then left the school to pursue his career.

Career

Early career
After leaving college, Williams worked at various technology jobs and start-up firms in Key West, Florida, and in Dallas and Austin, Texas, before returning to his family farm in Nebraska. In 1996 Williams moved to Sebastopol, California in Sonoma County to work for the technology publishing company O'Reilly Media. He started at O'Reilly in a marketing position, later becoming an independent contractor writing computer code, which led to freelance opportunities with companies including Intel and Hewlett-Packard. While he was working at O'Reilly, he also started a website called EvHead.com, where he first began blogging about his personal thoughts.

Pyra Labs and Blogger

Evan Williams and Meg Hourihan co-founded Pyra Labs to make project management software. A note-taking feature spun off as Blogger, one of the first web applications for creating and managing weblogs. Williams coined the term "blogger" and was instrumental in the popularization of the term "blog". Pyra survived the departure of Hourihan and other employees, and was later acquired by Google on February 13, 2003.

In 2003, Williams was named to the MIT Technology Review TR100 as one of the top 100 innovators in the world under the age of 35. In 2004, he was named one of PC Magazine's "People of the Year", along with Hourihan and Paul Bausch, for their work on Blogger.

Odeo and Obvious Corporation

Williams officially left Google on October 8, 2004, to co-found Odeo, a podcast company. In late 2006, Williams co-founded Obvious Corporation with Biz Stone and other former Odeo employees, to acquire all previous properties from Odeo's former backers. In April 2007, Odeo was acquired by Sonic Mountain.

Twitter
Among Obvious Corporation's projects was Twitter, a popular, free social networking and micro-blogging service. Twitter was spun out as a new company in April 2007, with Williams as co-founder, board member, and investor. In October 2008, Williams became CEO of Twitter, succeeding Jack Dorsey, who became chairman of the board.

By February 2009, Compete.com ranked Twitter the third most-used social network, based on their count of 6 million unique monthly visitors and 55 million monthly visits. As of February 2013, Twitter had 200 million registered users. It gets 300,000 new users a day and, as of August 2015, was ranked twelfth in the world. It receives more than 300 million unique visitors and more than five billion people in traffic a month. 75% of its traffic comes from outside of Twitter.com.

In October 2010, Williams stepped down from the CEO position, explaining that he would be "completely focused on product strategy," and appointed Dick Costolo as his replacement.

Following the announcement of Twitter's initial public offering (IPO) in 2013, the company was valued at between US$14 billion and US$20 billion.

On April 6, 2017, an article announced Williams would sell 30 percent of his stock in Twitter, for "personal reasons."

In February 2019, Williams stepped down from his role as a board member of Twitter.

Medium
On September 25, 2012, Williams created the publishing platform, Medium. Initially, it was available only to early adopters, but was opened to the public in 2013.

On April 5, 2013, Williams and Stone announced that they would be unwinding Obvious Corporation as they focused on individual startups.

On July 12, 2022, it was announced Williams would step down as Medium's CEO and become the chairman of the board.

Obvious Ventures 
In 2014, Williams co-founded the venture capital firm Obvious Ventures with James Joaquin and Vishal Vasishth. The firm is focused on companies they believe can make a positive change in the world. Since its inception the fund has raised about $585 million—$123 million in its first round, $191 million in its second and $271 million in its latest round.

Personal life
Williams lives in the San Francisco area with his wife, Sara, with whom he has two children. He is a vegetarian, and has invested – through the Obvious Corporation – in plant-based meat alternative, Beyond Meat.

Views 
Williams has been quoted as having a philosophy that it is important to conserve time, do fewer things, and to avoid distractions.

Williams presented at the 2013 XOXO Festival in Portland, Oregon, and explained his understanding of Internet commerce. During his XOXO session, Williams also likened the Internet to "a lot of other major technological revolutions that have taken place in the history of the world," such as agriculture, and asserted that the Internet is not a utopia.

After President Donald Trump credited his election win to the use of Twitter, Evan Williams stated that if true, he was sorry, and he was concerned that the Internet platform rewarded extremes. Williams told the Associated Press that he was wrong to think that an open platform where people could speak freely would make the world a better place. His musings about future business objectives include considerations about the effect of the Internet upon society.

References

External links

 
 

1972 births
Living people
American bloggers
American computer businesspeople
Businesspeople from Nebraska
Twitter, Inc. people
People from Merrick County, Nebraska
American billionaires
American technology chief executives
21st-century American businesspeople
20th-century American businesspeople
American chairpersons of corporations
Directors of Twitter, Inc.